Dame Tamsyn Imison, DBE (1 May 1937 – 18 September 2017) was a prominent British educator and "educational strategist" whose first career was as a scientific illustrator.

Imison was educated at Somerville College, Oxford. After having a family of three, she went into teaching science in 1972 and taught for nearly 30 years. Between 1984 and 2000, she was Headteacher of the Hampstead School in north London. Imison wrote, researched and lectured on numerous topics related to academia, including  Leadership, ICT, Comprehensive Schooling, Creativity, Learning, Schools of the Future, Post 16 and Women Leaders.

She chaired various committees and was made an Honorary Fellow of Somerville College, Oxford, Queen Mary, University of London, and the Institute of Education, University of London. 
 
She retired in 2005 to Halesworth Suffolk. There she devoted a large part of her time improving the natural environment in the town. She helped found and run 'Halesworth in Bloom' achieving her goal of becoming best small town in 2015. She also helped the park gain green flag status and created a new Hooker Trail within to celebrate the famous botanist Sir Joseph Dalton Hooker who once lived in Halesworth. In June 2017, she organized a weekend long celebration of his bicentenary.

Imison died of cancer, aged 80.

References

External links
TES interview
Science Education — is there a crisis? 
Honorary Fellow, Somerville College, University of Oxford

1937 births
2017 deaths
Academics of Queen Mary University of London
Alumni of Somerville College, Oxford
British educational theorists
British illustrators
Dames Commander of the Order of the British Empire
Fellows of Somerville College, Oxford
Place of birth missing
Schoolteachers from Suffolk